Hidimba was a powerful demon king who is mentioned in the epic Mahābhārata. He was killed by Bhima and this is recounted in the 9th sub-parva (Hidimba-vadha Parva) of the Adi Parva.

Death 
The demon Hidimba lived in a forest along with his sister Hidimbi. While travelling, the Pandavas stopped in that forest to rest while Bhima stood on guard. Hidimba ate human flesh and became eager to devour them. He sent Hidimbi to kill the Pandavas and to bring them back to him. Hidimbi went on his instructions, but her mind changed on seeing Bhima. She assumed the form of a beautiful woman and told about her brother to Bhima. She proposed him to become his husband.

Hidimba got furious at his sister and rushed towards her to kill her. Bhima interjected Hidimba and challenged him to fight him instead. The sleeping Pandavas woke up on hearing the sounds of them fighting and offered to help Bhima in killing Hidimba but Bhima asked them to watch the duel as spectators. Arjuna reminded Bhima that daybreak was about to set in and the demons become stronger at that time and Bhima should kill Hidimba as soon as possible. Bhima ended up crushing and tearing Hidimba into two pieces.

Temples
There are a few temples dedicated to Hiḍimbā's sister Hiḍimbī in Himachal Pradesh.

The most famous temple is the Hiḍimbā Devi Temple in Manali. Some of the sacred objects enshrined here include chariots, footprints and a small statue. Hiḍimbā is one of the most powerful deities in Kullu Valley. The pagoda-shaped wooden temple, situated in the Deodar forests, has intricately-carved wooden doors and wooden shikhara, is believed to be over 500 years old.

Festivals
Believers may travel to the town of Kullu to participate in the annual festival of Dussehra, where Hiḍimbā's chariot leads a rally of gods from all over the Kullu valley, escorting the main chariot of Raghunāth. At the end of the seven-day festivities, on the "Lanka Dahan" day, sacrifices are made to Hiḍimbā. Ghaṭotkaca is also a popular deity in the neighboring Banjar village and Siraj district.

See also
Hidimba Devi Temple

References

Rakshasa in the Mahabharata
Characters in the Mahabharata